Erfan Golmohammadi (born 18 July 1997) is an Iranian footballer who plays as a forward for Iranian club Nassaji Mazandaran in the Persian Gulf Pro League.

Club career

Nassaji Mazandaran
He made his debut in Iran Pro League for Nassaji in 5th fixtures of 2020–21 Iran Pro League against Persepolis while he substituted in for Karim Eslami.

References 

Living people
People from Hormozgan Province
Iranian footballers
Esteghlal F.C. players
Nassaji Mazandaran players
Persian Gulf Pro League players
Association football forwards
1997 births